Florencia is a town and municipality in the Cauca Department, Colombia.

References

External links

 Florencia municipal website

Municipalities of Cauca Department